Alger Hutchinson Wood (1891–1970) was an American football and basketball coach.  Wood served as the head football coach at Doane College in 1917 and at Alma College in 1919, compiling a career college football coaching record of 5–11.  Wood was also the head basketball coach at Doane in 1916–17 and Alma from 1918 to 1920, tallying a career college basketball mark of 19–27.

Coaching career

Doane
Wood was the 17th head football coach at Doane College in Crete, Nebraska and he held that position for the 1916 season.  His coaching record at Doane was 2–6.

Alma
In 1919, Wood was named the head football coach at Alma College in Alma, Michigan.  He held that position for the 1919 season.  His coaching record at Alma was 3–5.

References

External links
 

1891 births
1970 deaths
Alma Scots football coaches
Alma Scots men's basketball coaches
Basketball coaches from Michigan
Doane Tigers football coaches
Doane Tigers men's basketball coaches
People from St. Louis, Michigan